1-Butyne is an organic compound with the chemical formula HC2CH2CH3. It is a colorless combustible gas. 1-Butyne participates in reactions typical for terminal alkynes, such as alkyne metathesis, hydrogenation, condensation with formaldehyde. Based on its heat of combustion, it is slightly less stable than its isomer 2-butyne.

See also
 2-Butyne
 Butadiene
 Cyclobutene

References

External links
 NIST Chemistry WebBook page for 1-butyne

Alkynes